Masoud Moradi (born August 22, 1965 in Roudsar) is an Iranian retired football referee. Moradi had been a FIFA international referee from 2000 until 2010.

Moradi has been an Iran Pro League referee since 1998 and is currently head of Islamic Republic of Iran Football Federation's refereeing department.

Moradi has been an official in major competitions including the: 
2003 FIFA Confederations Cup
2004 AFC Asian Cup
2007 AFC Champions League
2007 AFC Asian Cup qualification
2007 Asian Cup.
2008 Beijing Olympics.
2010 AFF Suzuki Cup

References

Iranian football referees
1965 births
Living people
AFC Asian Cup referees